Lawas Airport  is a Short Take-off and Landing (STOL) airport serving Lawas, a town in Limbang Division, Sarawak, Malaysia.

A plan has been made to relocate the current airport to a new site, because the current site is considered unsafe. The airport is located near a river, and some land corrosion had been spotted along the riverbank. The proposed new airport will be able to accommodate ATR 72-500 aircraft operated by MASwings, and the airport will not only be used by people in Lawas, but also people near the surrounding Sarawak-Sabah border.

Airlines and destinations

Incidents and Accidents
 On 24 August 2011, a MASwings aircraft Twin Otter DHC6 broke off its front landing gear upon landing. All 16 passengers and two crew escaped unharmed in the incident.

See also

 List of airports in Malaysia

References

External links

Short Take-Off and Landing Airports (STOL) at Malaysia Airports Holdings Berhad

Airports in Sarawak
Lawas District